Striporama is a 1953 comedy film directed by Jerald Intrator. The film starred a number of burlesque comedy, dance and striptease acts that were popular during the early 1950s. Today, it is best known as one of the few feature films starring pin-up model Bettie Page.

Plot

A meeting of the “Council of Culture” is taking place in New York City. The council is collecting various art forms for inclusion in a time capsule, However, the council members refuse to consider having mention of burlesque entertainment in their time capsule. News of the decisions reaches a trio of burlesque comics (Jack Diamond, Mandy Kay and Charles Harris), who disrupt the council's meeting by imitating gangsters. The three funnymen take out a movie projector to offer evidence of the artistic value of burlesque entertainment. The remainder of the film is a plotless revue that features such acts as stripper Rosita Royce dancing with a number of trained birds, the Apache-style dance duo of Marinette and Andre, a male bodybuilder dubbed “Mr. America” who flexes his muscles and plays the harmonica while balancing a blonde woman on his shoulders, a number of routines featuring solo women (including Lili St. Cyr) in various acts of undressing, and several comedy sketches including Diamond, Kay and Harris.

Production and rediscovery

Striporama was filmed in color, which was unusual for low-budget burlesque revue films. The production also offered the only color footage of Bettie Page in a speaking role. In the film, Page appears twice: in a comic sequence where she is the shared dream of roommates Diamond and Kay, and later as a harem girl who enjoyed an extended bubble bath. Striporama also saw an early appearance by actress Jeanne Carmen, who had a dialogue-free bit part as a streetwalker that circled the Marinette and Andre dance number.

Striporama was originally released in adults-only theaters that specialized in exploitation films. Over the years, the last five minutes of original footage became lost. As a public domain film, it had been available from several home video labels.

In May 2001, the film had a theatrical re-release in New York City. Critics who reviewed Striporama nearly a half-century after it was created compared its rediscovery to its time capsule plot device. David Sterritt, writing in the Christian Science Monitor, noted the film was “quite tame despite its lurid title, containing little that would push the boundaries of today's PG-13 rating.”  Michael Atkinson, writing in The Village Voice, found the film “occupying a nudity-free yet salacious middle ground between, say, Singin' in the Rain (the “Beautiful Girl” fashion show is echoed here) and progressive seaminess like Ed Wood and Stephen Apostolof's Orgy of the Dead.” Armond White, reviewing the film for the New York Press, considered the film “a shabby camp experience, but as a relic of what show business and movies used to be, it instructs one on changing tastes in sex and humor.”

References

External links

1953 films
1953 comedy films
Films about striptease
American comedy films
1950s English-language films
1950s American films